Scaffold in a barn are loosely laid poles or joists generally above the drive floor on which crops are piled. The term has the same meaning of a temporary, elevated platform in other uses of the word.

References

Barns